The Secretary of State for Innovation, Universities and Skills was a Cabinet minister in the United Kingdom, heading the Department for Innovation, Universities and Skills (DIUS). The post was created on 28 June 2007 from parts of the Department for Education and Skills (DfES) and the Department of Trade and Industry (DTI). It was merged with the Department for Business, Enterprise and Regulatory Reform (BERR) on 5 June 2009, to form the Department for Business, Innovation and Skills. The first and only Secretary of State was John Denham.

The Secretary was responsible for expanding high-end graduate skills and raising the skills of the wider adult workforce. The Department took over responsibility from the Department of Trade and Industry for making Britain "one of the best places in the world for science, research and innovation". It was also responsible for the "development, funding and performance" of higher and further education.

Secretary of State

Colour key (for political parties):

See also 

 Minister of State for Universities

References 

Innovation, Universities and Skills
Defunct ministerial offices in the United Kingdom
2007 establishments in the United Kingdom
2009 disestablishments in the United Kingdom